Olympique de Marseille won the 1992–93 Division 1 season of the French Association Football League with 53 points but lost its title due to a bribery scandal. The club that finished second, Paris Saint Germain refused it, making it unattributed.

Affaire VA-OM

In 1993 Olympique de Marseille reached both the very pinnacle and the very bottom of the European club game. A corruption scandal and a Canal+'s shining light for Paris Saint-Germain would threaten their hegemony. The European Cup was denied, but the glory would eventually come for Marseille. As the European Cup was renamed the Champions League in 1992–93, Marseille reached the final for the second time in three years, but this time they prevailed. Marseille won Group A and suddenly found themselves in the final against Milan. Basile Boli hit home the winning goal as Marseille became the first French side to win a European trophy and the only to win the Champions League. Didier Deschamps and Fabien Barthez became the youngest captain and goalkeeper, respectively, to capture the title. Their fans greeted the triumph by chanting "A jamais les premiers" because they won the first "Classico" against PSG in 1971. The city exploded with a joy shared across the nation but no sooner had the trophy been hoist aloft than the celebrations were brought to a halt. 

A corruption scandal revolving around a match against Valenciennes emerged a few days before the Champions League final. Allegations of match fixing were levelled at them and their president Bernard Tapie. It is believed that Tapie bribed Valenciennes to lose so that Olympique de Marseille would win the French League earlier, giving them more time to prepare for the Champions League Final. Valenciennes players Christophe Robert, Jorge Burruchaga and Jacques Glassmann claimed that the Marseille midfielder Jean-Jacques Eydelie offered them ₣250,000 to "take the foot off of the gas" in a May 20 match against Marseille. Marseille was later stripped of their league title and relegated to Division 2 by the French Football Federation, while Bernard Tapie was forced to step down as its president. Marseille was not stripped of the Champions League, as the match in question was not in the competition, but lost the right of title-defense in the 1993–94 UEFA Champions League, as well as regular reigning European champions match in 1993 Intercontinental Cup and 1993 European Super Cup.

No winner was declared for the 1992–1993 season. The LFP allotted the title to Paris Saint-Germain but owners Canal + refused it. The TV chain feared the reactions of their subscribers in Provence and threatened to withdraw football completely if the title was allotted to PSG. Ultimately the LFP decided that the 1993 title would remain unattributed. Canal+ refused letting the club participate in the following season's Champions League after Marseille's exclusion by the UEFA.

Participating teams

 Auxerre
 Bordeaux
 SM Caen
 Le Havre AC
 Lens
 Lille
 Olympique Lyonnais
 Olympique de Marseille
 FC Metz
 AS Monaco
 Montpellier HSC
 FC Nantes Atlantique
 Nîmes Olympique
 Paris Saint-Germain
 AS Saint-Étienne
 FC Sochaux-Montbéliard
 RC Strasbourg
 Sporting Toulon Var
 Toulouse FC
 US Valenciennes Anzin

League table

Promoted from 1992–93 French Division 2, who will play in 1993–94 French Division 1
 FC Martigues: Champions of Division 2, winner of Division 2 group A
 Angers SCO: Runners-up, winners of Division 2 group B
 AS Cannes: Winners of playoffs against Valenciennes

Results

Relegation play-offs

|}

Top goalscorers

References

Ligue 1 seasons
France
1